The Western Region was a region of British Railways from 1948. The region ceased to be an operating unit in its own right on completion of the "Organising for Quality" initiative on 6 April 1992. The Region consisted principally of ex-Great Western Railway lines, minus certain lines west of Birmingham, which were transferred to the London Midland Region in 1963 and with the addition of all former Southern Railway routes west of Exeter, which were subsequently rationalised.

History 

When British Railways was created at the start of 1948, it was immediately subdivided into six Regions, largely based upon pre-nationalisation ownership. The Western Region initially consisted of the former Great Western Railway system, totalling 3,782 route miles and with its headquarters at Paddington. To this was added some minor railways and joint lines in which the GWR had an interest:
Brynmawr and Western Valleys Railway
Clifton Extension Railway
Easton and Church Hope Railway
Great Western and Great Central Joint Railway – including the Banbury Junction Railway between Banbury and Culworth Junction
Halesowen Railway
Rhymney Joint Railway
Severn and Wye and Severn Bridge Railway
Shrewsbury and Hereford Railway
Shrewsbury and Wellington Joint Railway
Shrewsbury and Welshpool Railway
Shropshire and Montgomeryshire Railway
Tenbury Railway
Vale of Towy Railway
West Cornwall Railway
West London Railway
West London Extension Railway
Weymouth and Portland Railway
Wrexham and Minera Railway
Regional boundaries were adjusted several times in subsequent years. The first such adjustments took place on 2 April 1950, under which the WR gained
Banbury Merton Street station from the London Midland Region
Bicester to Oxford from the London Midland Region
Broom to Byfield (excluding Byfield station) from the London Midland Region
Cole to Bath, Bridgwater, Burnham and Wells from the Southern Region
Exeter to Bude, Ilfracombe, Padstow, Plymouth and branches from the Southern Region
Hadley Junction to Coalport from the London Midland Region
Leamington Spa Avenue station from the London Midland Region
Marylebone to Northolt Junction from the Eastern Region
Neasden to Harrow (excluding Harrow station) from the Eastern Region
Selly Oak to Bath and Bristol, and all branches from that route from the London Midland Region
Warwick Milverton station from the London Midland Region
At the same time, the WR lost several lines:
Crudgington to Nantwich to the London Midland Region
Grafton & Burbage to Andover Junction to the Southern Region
Newbury to Winchester to the Southern Region
Reading West to Basingstoke to the Southern Region
Sparkford to Weymouth, including branches to the Southern Region
Thorney & Kingsbury Halt to Yeovil to the Southern Region
Thornfalcon to Chard Central to the Southern Region
Westbury to Salisbury to the Southern Region

The Great Western Railway (GWR) was established during the 19th century. Although run down by the Second World War, its management opposed its nationalisation into British Railways. Even after nationalisation under the Transport Act 1947 and amalgamation with the other railway companies as British Railways, the new Region continued its enmity with its powerful neighbour, the London Midland Region, which had been born out of the London, Midland and Scottish Railway. There were few incomers to the Region at senior level: for example, the Chairman of the Regional Board from 1955, Reggie Hanks, came from the motor industry but had been a Swindon Works apprentice. In the 1956–1962 period, a range of express trains were named and their coaches given GWR-style chocolate and cream colours.

Major changes came on the appointment from outside as Regional Managers Stanley Raymond (in 1962) and Gerry Fiennes (in 1963); both worked hard to eliminate the Western Region's large financial operating deficit.

Some revenues were increased, but most of the savings came from cuts. Adjusted for transfer of Banbury northward to LMR and Dorset, Devon and Cornwall from SR, the assets of WR reduced greatly over the decade 1955–1965 and especially from 1963 to 1965:

Infrastructure 
Major new investment in infrastructure did not go ahead substantially until after 1955. The earliest projects included the rebuilding of stations at Banbury and Plymouth, both postponed since the 1940s; of less long-term relevance were new facilities at Paignton for summer holiday passenger traffic and a marshalling yard at Margam in South Wales. Bristol Parkway station opened in 1972.

Rolling stock 

The Western Region built a large number of steam locomotives to GWR designs including 341 pannier tanks, even after the advent of diesel shunters. Both 2-6-0 tender and 2-6-2 tank engine variants of the BR Standard Class 3 were also built by the Western Region. It was the first region of BR to eliminate steam traction under the 1955 Modernisation Plan.

While the other BR regions introduced diesel-electric locomotives the Western Region went its own way by purchasing a complete range of diesel-hydraulic locomotives covering the type 1 to type 4 power requirements. These included the Warship locomotives, which were based on proven West German designs, the British-designed Class 14, Hymek and Western types; these were all eventually withdrawn and replaced with more standard British Rail diesel-electric classes such as the Class 37 and Class 47 upon the British Railways Board declaring diesel-hydraulic locomotives "non-standard" in an attempt to reduce costs.

One of the major improvements on the Western Region, and later on the Eastern Region East Coast Main Line, was the introduction on the Great Western Main Line of the InterCity 125 trains in 1976/7 bringing major accelerations to the timetables.

References 

Allen G. Freeman, The Western since 1948, Ian Allan (1979) 

British Rail regions